Djegui Bathily (born February 25, 1977) is a Senegalese judoka, who played for the heavyweight category. He won two bronze medals for his division at the 2007 All-Africa Games in Algiers, Algeria, and at the 2008 African Judo Championships in Agadir, Morocco.

Bathily represented Senegal at the 2008 Summer Olympics in Beijing, where he competed for the men's heavyweight class (+100 kg). He received a bye for the second preliminary round, before losing out, by two yuko and a non-combativity technique (P29), to U.S. judoka Daniel McCormick.

References

External links

NBC 2008 Olympics profile

Senegalese male judoka
Living people
Olympic judoka of Senegal
Judoka at the 2008 Summer Olympics
1977 births
African Games silver medalists for Senegal
African Games medalists in judo
African Games bronze medalists for Senegal
Competitors at the 2007 All-Africa Games